Lectionary 184, designated by siglum ℓ 184 (in the Gregory-Aland numbering of New Testament manuscripts) is a Greek New Testament manuscript written on parchment. Textual critics Westcott and Hort referred to it by the siglum 39e, textual critic Scrivener by 259e. It is dated by a colophon (this being a brief statement about the place/date/person who copied it) to the year 1319. It is currently housed at the British Library (Burney 22) in London.

Description 
The manuscript is a codex (the forerunner to the modern book), written in Greek minuscule letters, on 248 parchment leaves, two columns per page, with 27-28 lines per page. Scrivener described it as being written in a large, clear hand, however due to the copyist's carelessness, half of many words are omitted, is replete with itacisms (spelling mistakes for common sounding letters), employs the incorrect usage of nu-moveable (this being the use of the Greek letter nu (ν) at the end of verbs before a consonant or vowel) causing hiatus, and several words and phrases are omitted due to homoeoteleuton (this being words and/or phrases which end with the same letters or same word). The codex uses gold ink for illuminations and section titles, with red ink used for liturgical directions, stops, and pauses. Though it contains breathings and accents in full (markings utilised to indicate changes of pitch or emphasis), most are inaccurate. There are some traces of a second scribe making corrections.

The codex is considered an Evangelistarium, containing all the Church lessons from the Gospels throughout the year. It also includes the Church lessons for Holy Week (week prior to Easter Sunday) and saint's days.
Part of the first leaf (John 1:11-13) is on paper and was supplied by a later hand. According to theologian and textual-critic Caspar René Gregory, it has "good text". When it was bound, several pages were misplaced by the binder, with which the order of pages 195-204 should be: 195-196; 203-204; 199-201; 197-198.

Text
Due to several departures from readings in the New Testament Textus Receptus (the most common edition of the Greek New Testament), the readings of the codex are cited often by textual critic Constantin von Tischendorf in his critical Greek New Testament, the biblical scholar and textual critic Alford in his Greek New Testament, and Kurt Aland in the Nestle-Aland critical edition of the Greek New Testament.

Some notable readings
Below are some readings of the manuscript which agree or disagree with variant readings in other Greek manuscripts, or with varying ancient translations of the New Testament. See the main article Textual variants in the New Testament.

 (desert)
omit - 'ℓ 184 B L ff sy sa bo
incl. - Majority of manuscripts

 (your son) - 'ℓ 184 1344 ℓ 1579
 (son or ox) -   B W Δ 28 565 700

 (the sea of Tiberius) - 'ℓ 184''' 0210 1242 1344 2174
 (the sea of Galilee of Tiberius) - Majority of manuscripts

 History 

The manuscript once belonged to classical scholar Charles Burney, along with the minuscule codices 480, 481, 482, 484, and 485. It was examined by Scrivener and Gregory. Scrivener collated its text along with 23 other manuscripts. The manuscript is cited in the critical editions of the Greek New Testament (UBS3, UBS4).

The codex is currently located in the British Library (Burney 22) in London.

 See also 

 List of New Testament lectionaries
 Biblical manuscript
 Textual criticism

 Notes and references 

 Further reading 

 Westcott in Smith's Dictionary of the Bible''.

External links 
 Burney 22 at the British Library.
 Digital Images online at the British Library.

Greek New Testament lectionaries
14th-century biblical manuscripts